Juma Waswa Balunywa (born 3 December 1955) is an Ugandan scholar in management, leadership and entrepreneurship. He is also an academic administrator, working as the Principal of Makerere University Business School. He has been at the helm of the institution since 1991, when MUBS was the Faculty of Commerce of Makerere University.

Balunywa has been credited with spearheading the private students’ scheme in Uganda that has become a model for many universities across the country and region.

Background and education
Balunywa was born in Kasolo Village, Bulamagi County, in Iganga District, on 3 December 1955. He attended Mwiri Primary School for his elementary schooling. He transferred to Jinja College for his O-Level education and studied at Namasagali College, for his A-Level studies.

Balunywa holds a Bachelors of Commerce degree obtained in 1979 from the University of Delhi in India. He also has a Master of Business Administration, awarded by the same university in 1981. His Doctor of Philosophy in Entrepreneurship was awarded in 2009, by the University of Stirling, in the United Kingdom.

Career
Balunywa started his academic career as lecturer in 1983, in the then Department of Commerce at Makerere University. In 1987, he was appointed a senior lecturer in the Department of Accounting, Banking and Finance, also at Makerere, serving there from 1987 until 1990. He then served as Dean Faculty of Commerce, Makerere University from 1991 to 1998. In 1997, he was instrumental in the creation of Makerere University Business School (MUBS). MUBS was created in 1997 by the merger of the former faculty of Commerce at Makerere University and the then National College of Business Studies, Nakawa. Balunywa headed MUBS at its inception in 1997 as the school's first Director. In 1998, the position of Director was changed to Principal. In June 2018, Waswa Balunywa began another three-year term as the Principal of MUBS.

Balunywa served on the Board of Directors of the Bank of Uganda, the country's central bank and national banking regulator, from 2001 until 2012. He was the serving board chairman of Uganda Airlines, at the time of its liquidation in 2001. Balunywa is the Patron of the Balunywa Foundation in memory of his father who disappeared under mysterious circumstances during Idi Amin's regime. The foundation focuses on helping needy youth and women in obtaining vocational skills for self sustenance.

References

External links 
 Official website

Academic staff of Makerere University
People from Iganga District
1955 births
Living people
Alumni of the University of Stirling
Delhi University alumni